Mohammadabad may refer to:

India 

 Mohammadabad, Farrukhabad
Mohammadabad, Ghazipur

Iran

Alborz Province 

 Mohammadabad, former name of Mohammadshahr, a city in Karaj County, Alborz Province
 Mohammadabad, Alborz, a village in Nazarabad County, Alborz Province
 Mohammadabad-e Afkham ol Dowleh, a village in Nazarabad County, Alborz Province
 Mohammadabad-e Afshar, a village in Savojbolagh County, Alborz Province
 Mohammadabad Rural District (Karaj County), an administrative subdivision of Karaj County, Alborz Province

Ardabil Province 

 Mohammadabad, Ardabil, a village in Meshgin Shahr County

Bushehr Province 

 Mohammadabad, Bushehr

Chaharmahal and Bakhtiari Province 

 Mohammadabad, Chaharmahal and Bakhtiari, a village in Shahrekord County
 Mohammadabad-e Yek, a village in Kuhrang County
 Mohammadabad-e Tabatabayi, a village in Shahrekord County

East Azerbaijan Province 

 Mohammadabad, East Azerbaijan, a village in Ahar County

Fars Province 

 Mohammadabad, Bavanat, a village in Bavanat County
 Mohammadabad, Forg, a village in Darab County
 Mohammadabad, Hashivar, a village in Darab County
 Mohammadabad, Qaleh Biyaban, a village in Darab County
 Mohammadabad, Eqlid, a village in Eqlid County
 Mohammadabad, Estahban, a village in Estahban County
 Mohammadabad, Fasa, a village in Fasa County
 Mohammadabad, Jahrom, a village in Jahrom County
 Mohammadabad, Kazerun, a village in Kazerun County
 Mohammadabad, Jereh and Baladeh, a village in Kazerun County
 Mohammadabad, Kharameh, a village in Kharameh County
 Mohammadabad-e Maz, a village in Khonj County
 Mohammadabad, Marvdasht, a village in Marvdasht County
 Mohammadabad, Neyriz, a village in Neyriz County
 Mohammadabad-e Sofla, Fars, a village in Neyriz County
 Mohammadabad Rural District (Fars Province), in Marvdasht County

Gilan Province 

 Mohammadabad, Gilan, a village in Rasht County

Golestan Province 

 Mohammadabad, Aliabad, Aliabad County
 Mohammadabad, Aqqala, Aqqala County
 Mohammadabad-e Bala, Aqqala County
 Mohammadabad-e Pain, Golestan, Aqqala County
 Mohammadabad, Bandar-e Gaz, Bandar-e Gaz County
 Mohammadabad, Galikash, Galikash County
 Mohammadabad, Gonbad-e Qabus, Gonbad-e Qabus County
 Mohammadabad, Gorgan, Gorgan County
 Mohammadabad, Kordkuy, Kordkuy County
 Mohammadabad, Minudasht, Minudasht County
 Mohammadabad, Ramian, Ramian County

Hamadan Province 

 Mohammadabad, Hamadan, a village in Asadabad County
 Muhammadabad, Kanudarahang, a village in Kabudarahang County
 Mohammadabad, Nahavand, a village in Nahavand County
 Mohammadabad, Giyan, a village in Nahavand County

Hormozgan Province 

 Mohammadabad, Bandar Abbas, a village in Bandar Abbas County
 Mohammadabad, Hajjiabad, a village in Hajjiabad County
 Mohammadabad-e Kahuri, a village in Hajjiabad County
 Mohammadabad, Jask, a village in Jask County
 Shahrak-e Mohammadabad, a village in Jask County
 Mohammadabad, Rudan, a village in Rudan County

Ilam Province 

 Mohammadabad, Ilam, a village in Dehloran County

Isfahan Province

Aran va Bidgol County 

 Mohammadabad, Kavirat, a village in Aran va Bidgol County
 Mohammadabad (34°06′ N 51°23′ E), Sefiddasht, a village in Aran va Bidgol County

Isfahan County 

 Mohammadabad, Isfahan, a city in Isfahan County

Khur and Biabanak County

Nain County 

 Mohammadabad, Nain, a village in Nain County

Kerman Province

Anar County

Anbarabad County 

 Mohammadabad, Anbarabad, a village in Anbarabad County
 Mohammadabad, alternate name of Mahmudabad Mazaheri, a village in Anbarabad County
 Mohammadabad-e Anbari, a village in Anbarabad County
 Mohammadabad-e Kalantar, a village in Anbarabad County
 Mohammadabad-e Olya, Kerman, a village in Anbarabad County
 Mohammadabad-e Sofla, Kerman, a village in Anbarabad County
 Mohammadabad Rural District (Anbarabad County)

Arzuiyeh County 

 Mohammadabad, Arzuiyeh, a village in Arzuiyeh County

Baft County

Bam County 

 Mohammadabad-e Seyyed Nezam, a village in Bam County

Bardsir County 

 Mohammadabad, Bardsir, a village in Bardsir County

Fahraj County 

 Mohammadabad, Fahraj, a village in Fahraj County
 Mohammadabad-e Deh Gavi, a village in Fahraj County

Jiroft County 

 Mohammadabad-e Bab Skakan, a village in Jiroft County
 Mohammadabad-e Borumand, a village in Jiroft County
 Mohammadabad-e Do, Jiroft, a village in Jiroft County
 Mohammadabad-e Hishin, a village in Jiroft County

Kahnuj County 

 Mohammadabad, Kahnuj, a village in Kahnuj County

Kerman County 

 Mohammadabad, Baghin, a village in Kerman County
 Mohammadabad, Rayen, a village in Kerman County
 Mohammadabad, Shahdad, a village in Kerman County

Kuhbanan County 

 Mohammadabad, Kuhbanan, a village in Kuhbanan County
 Mohammadabad, Khorramdasht, a village in Kuhbanan County

Manujan County 

 Mohammadabad, Manujan, a village in Manujan County

Narmashir County 

 Mohammadabad-e Ab Shirin, a village in Narmashir County
 Mohammadabad-e Geluski, a village in Narmashir County
 Mohammadabad-e Moshk, a village in Narmashir County
 Mohammadabad-e Qaleh Shahid, a village in Narmashir County
 Mohammadabad-e Seyyed, a village in Narmashir County
 Mohammadabad-e Sheykh, a village in Narmashir County

Qaleh Ganj County 

 Mohammadabad, former name of Qaleh Ganj, Central District, Qaleh Ganj County

Rabor County 

 Mohammadabad, Rabor, a village in Rabor County

Rafsanjan County 

 Mohammadabad, Rafsanjan, a village in Rafsanjan County
 Mohammadabad, Azadegan, a village in Rafsanjan County
 Mohammadabad, Ferdows, a village in Rafsanjan County
 Mohammadabad, Razmavaran, a village in Rafsanjan County
 Mohammadabad, Sharifabad, a village in Rafsanjan County
 Mohammadabad-e Barkhvordar, a village in Rafsanjan County
 Mohammadabad-e Meysam, a village in Rafsanjan County
 Mohammadabad-e Saqi, a village in Rafsanjan County
 Mohammadabad-e Seyyed Jalal, a village in Rafsanjan County

Ravar County

Rigan County 

 Mohammadabad, Kerman a city in Central District, Rigan County
 Mohammadabad-e Gonbaki, a city in Gonbaki District, Rigan County
 Mohammadabad (village), Rigan, a village in Rigan County
 Mohammadabad-e Asghar Khan, a village in Rigan County
 Mohammadabad-e Chah-e Malek, a village in Rigan County
 Mohammadabad-e Rud Shur, a village in Rigan County
 Mohammadabad-e Sar Haddi, a village in Rigan County

Rudbar-e Jonubi County 

 Mohammadabad-e Do Ziyarati, a village in Rudbar-e Jonubi County
 Mohammadabad-e Kataki, a village in Rudbar-e Jonubi County

Shahr-e Babak County 

 Mohammadabad, Dehaj, a village in Shahr-e Babak County
 Mohammadabad, Estabraq, a village in Shahr-e Babak County
 Mohammadabad, Khabar, a village in Shahr-e Babak County
 Mohammadabad, Pa Qaleh, a village in Shahr-e Babak County
 Mohammadabad-e Seyyedha, a village in Shahr-e Babak County

Sirjan County 

 Mohammadabad, Balvard, a village in Sirjan County
 Mohammadabad-e Darvish, a village in Sirjan County
 Mohammadabad-e Mirza, a village in Sirjan County

Zarand County 

 Mohammadabad, Zarand, a village in Zarand County
 Mohammadabad Golshan, a village in Zarand County
 Mohammadabad Rural District (Zarand County)

Kermanshah Province 

 Mohammadabad, Harsin, a village in Harsin County
 Mohammadabad, Kangavar, a village in Kangavar County
 Mohammadabad, Sahneh, a village in Sahneh County

Khuzestan Province 

 Mohammadabad, Andika, a village in Andika County
 Mohammadabad, Bagh-e Malek, a village in Bagh-e Malek County
 Mohammadabad, Behbahan, a village in Behbahan County
 Mohammadabad, Lali, a village in Lali County
 Mohammadabad (31°55′ N 49°15′ E), Masjed Soleyman, a village in Masjed Soleyman County

Kohgiluyeh and Boyer-Ahmad Province 

 Mohammadabad, Sarrud-e Jonubi, a village in Boyer-Ahmad County
 Mohammadabad, Sarrud-e Shomali, a village in Boyer-Ahmad County
 Mohammadabad, Dana, a village in Dana County
 Mohammadabad, Gachsaran, a village in Gachsaran County
 Mohammadabad, Kohgiluyeh and Boyer-Ahmad, a village in Kohgiluyeh County

Kurdistan Province 

 Mohammadabad, Kurdistan, a village in Bijar County
 Mohammadabad-e Ali Akbar Khan, a village in Bijar County
 Mohammadabad-e Nil, a village in Bijar County
 Mohammadabad, Dehgolan, a village in Dehgolan County
 Mohammadabad, Bolbanabad, a village in Dehgolan County
 Mohammadabad, Divandarreh, a village in Divandarreh County
 Mohammadabad, Kamyaran, a village in Kamyaran County
 Mohammadabad, Bilavar, a village in Kamyaran County

Lorestan Province 

 Mohammadabad, Aligudarz, Aligudarz County, Lorestan Province
 Mohammadabad, Borujerd, Borujerd County, Lorestan Province
 Mohammadabad, Delfan, Delfan County, Lorestan Province
 Mohammadabad, Khorramabad, Khorramabad County, Lorestan Province
 Mohammadabad-e Garavand, Kuhdasht County, Lorestan Province
 Mohammadabad, Selseleh, Selseleh County, Lorestan Province

Markazi Province 

 Mohammadabad, Delijan, a village in Delijan County
 Mohammadabad, Khomeyn, a village in Khomeyn County
 Mohammadabad, Khondab, a village in Khondab County
 Mohammadabad, Mahallat, a village in Mahallat County
 Mohammadabad, Tafresh, a village in Tafresh County

Mazandaran Province 

 Mohammadabad, Amol, a village in Amol County
 Mohammadabad, Dabudasht, a village in Amol County
 Mohammadabad, Behshahr, a village in Behshahr County
 Mohammadabad, Chalus, a village in Chalus County
 Mohammadabad, Miandorud, a village in Miandorud County
 Mohammadabad (36°48′ N 53°11′ E), Miandorud, a village in Miandorud County
 Mohammadabad, Tonekabon, a village in Tonekabon County

North Khorasan Province 

 Mohammadabad, Bojnord, Bojnord County, North Khorasan Province
 Mohammadabad, Faruj, Faruj County, North Khorasan Province
 Mohammadabad, Maneh-o-Samalqan, Maneh-o-Samalqan County, North Khorasan Province
 Mohammadabad, Samalqan, Maneh-o-Samalqan County, North Khorasan Province
 Mohammadabad, Shirvan, Shirvan County, North Khorasan Province
 Mohammadabad-e Avaz, Maneh-o-Samalqan County, North Khorasan Province
 Mohammadabad-e Tabar, Jajrom County, North Khorasan Province

Qazvin Province 

 Mohammadabad, Qazvin, Qazvin County, Qazvin Province
 Mohammadabad, former name of Mandarabad, Buin Zahra County, Qazvin Province
 Mohammadabad-e Gar Gar, Buin Zahra County, Qazvin Province
 Mohammadabad-e Khareh, Buin Zahra County, Qazvin Province
 Duljak Khan-e Mohammadabad, Qazvin County, Qazvin Province

Qom Province 

 Mohammadabad, Qomrud, Qomrud Rural District, Central District, Qom County, Qom Province

Razavi Khorasan Province

Bakharz County 

 Mohammadabad, Bakharz, Bakharz County, Razavi Khorasan Province

Bardaskan County 

 Mohammadabad, Bardaskan, Bardaskan County, Razavi Khorasan Province

Chenaran County 

 Mohammadabad, Chenaran, Chenaran County, Razavi Khorasan Province
 Mohammadabad-e Baluch, Chenaran County, Razavi Khorasan Province

Dargaz County 

 Mohammadabad, former name of Dargaz, Razavi Khorasan Province

Fariman County 

 Mohammadabad-e Sar Cheshmeh Berashk, Fariman County, Razavi Khorasan Province

Gonabad County 

 Mohammadabad-e Lab-e Rud, Gonabad County, Razavi Khorasan Province

Joghatai County 

 Mohammadabad-e Gaft, Joghatai County, Razavi Khorasan Province

Kashmar County 

 Mohammadabad-e Andaleyb, Kashmar County, Razavi Khorasan Province

Khalilabad County 

 Mohammadabad, Khalilabad, Khalilabad County, Razavi Khorasan Province

Khvaf County 

 Mohammadabad, Khvaf, Central District, Khvaf County, Razavi Khorasan Province
 Mohammadabad, Sangan, Sangan District, Khvaf County, Razavi Khorasan Province

Mashhad County 

 Mohammadabad, Mashhad, Mashhad County, Razavi Khorasan Province
 Mohammadabad-e Ilkhani, Mashhad County, Razavi Khorasan Province

Nishapur County 

 Mohammadabad, Nishapur, Central District, Nishapur County, Razavi Khorasan Province
 Mohammadabad-e Do Khaneh, Central District, Nishapur County, Razavi Khorasan Province
 Mohammadabad, Zeberkhan, Zeberkhan District, Nishapur County, Razavi Khorasan Province

Quchan County 

 Mohammadabad-e Olya, Razavi Khorasan, Quchan County, Razavi Khorasan Province
 Mohammadabad-e Sharqi, Quchan County, Razavi Khorasan Province
 Mohammadabad-e Sofla, Razavi Khorasan, Quchan County, Razavi Khorasan Province

Rashtkhvar County 

 Mohammadabad, Rashtkhvar, Rashtkhvar County, Razavi Khorasan Province

Sabzevar County 

 Mohammadabad, Khavashod, Rud Ab District, Sabzevar County, Razavi Khorasan Province
 Mohammadabad, Kuh Hamayi, Rud Ab District, Sabzevar County, Razavi Khorasan Province

Taybad County 

 Mohammadabad, Taybad, Taybad County, Razavi Khorasan Province

Torbat-e Jam County 

 Mohammadabad, Torbat-e Jam, Torbat-e Jam County, Razavi Khorasan Province
 Mohammad Abad, Torbat-e Jam, Torbat-e Jam County, Razavi Khorasan Province
 Mohammadabad, Mian Jam, Torbat-e Jam County, Razavi Khorasan Province
 Mohammadabad, Nasrabad, Torbat-e Jam, Torbat-e Jam County, Razavi Khorasan Province

Zave County 

 Mohammadabad, Zave, Zave County, Razavi Khorasan Province

Semnan Province 

 Mohammadabad, Damghan, a village in Damghan County
 Mohammadabad, Garmsar, a village in Garmssar County
 Mohammadabad, Shahrud, a village in Shahrud County
 Mohammadabad Pol-e Abrisham, a village in Shahrud County

Sistan and Baluchestan Province 

 Mohammadabad, Bampur, a village in Bampur County
 Mohammadabad (28°34′ N 60°41′ E), Eskelabad, a village in Khash County
 Mohammadabad (28°42′ N 60°34′ E), Eskelabad, a village in Khash County
 Mohammadabad-e Padgan, a village in Khash County
 Mohammadabad-e Pain Talarak, a village in Khash County
 Mohammadabad-e Shah Nur, a village in Khash County
 Mohammadabad-e Pain, Sistan and Baluchestan, a village in Mirjaveh County
 Mohammadabad, Sistan and Baluchestan, Sistan and Baluchestan Province
 Mohammadabad, Hamun, Sistan and Baluchestan Province

South Khorasan Province

Boshruyeh County 

 Mohammadabad, Kerend, a village in Boshruyeh County

Darmian County 

 Mohammadabad, Darmian, a village in Darmian County
 Mohammadabad-e Olya, South Khorasan, a village in Darmian County
 Mohammadabad-e Sofla, South Khorasan, a village in Darmian County

Khusf County 

 Mohammadabad, Qaleh Zari, a village in Khusf County
 Mohammadabad, alternate name of Taqab, South Khorasan, a village in Khusf County

Nehbandan County 

 Mohammadabad (1), Bandan, a village in Nehbandan County
 Mohammadabad (2), Bandan, a village in Nehbandan County
 Mohammadabad, Neh, a village in Nehbandan County
 Mohammadabad, Shusef, a village in Nehbandan County
 Mohammadabad-e Razzaqzadeh, a village in Nehbandan County

Qaen County 

 Mohammadabad-e Alam, a village in Qaen County
 Mohammadabad-e Chahak, a village in Qaen County

Sarbisheh County 

 Mohammadabad-e Kharkash, a village in Sarbisheh County

Tabas County 

 Mohammadabad, Tabas, a village in Tabas County
 Mohammadabad (34°11′ N 56°57′ E), Dastgerdan, a village in Tabas County
 Mohammadabad (34°18′ N 56°54′ E), Dastgerdan, a village in Tabas County
 Mohammadabad-e Chah Kavir, a village in Tabas County

Zirkuh County 

 Mohammadabad, Zirkuh, a village in Zirkuh County

Tehran Province 

 Mohammadabad, Malard, a village in Malard County
 Mohammadabad, Rey, a village in Rey County
 Mohammadabad, alternate name of Mahmudabad, Malard, a village in Malard County
 Mohammadabad-e Amin, a village in Rey County
 Mohammadabad-e Arab, a village in Varamin County
 Mohammadabad-e Ayala, a village in Qarchak County
 Mohammadabad-e Nayiniha, a village in Malard County
 Mohammadabad-e Peyghambar, a village in Robat Karim County

West Azerbaijan Province 

 Mohammadabad, Chaldoran, a village in Chaldoran County
 Mohammadabad, Maku, a village in Maku County
 Mohammadabad, Shahin Dezh, a village in Shahin Dezh County

Yazd Province

Bafq County 
 Mohammadabad-e Gowd Ginestan, a village in Bafq County

Khatam County

Mehriz County 

 Mohammadabad-e Alizadeh, a village in Mehriz County

Meybod County 

 Mohammadabad, Meybod, a village in Meybod County

Taft County 

 Mohammadabad, Garizat, a village in Taft County
 Mohammadabad, Nasrabad, a village in Taft County
 Mohammadabad-e Nilchi, a village in Taft County
 Mohammadabad-e Saidabad, a village in Taft County

Yazd County 

 Mohammadabad, Yazd, a village in Yazd County
 Mohammadabad, Zarach, a village in Yazd County
 Mohammadabad Rural District (Yazd Province), in Yazd County

Zanjan Province 

 Mohammadabad, Zanjan, a village in Khodabandeh County
 Mohammadabad, Bizineh Rud, a village in Khodabandeh County
 Mohammadabad, Tarom, a village in Tarom County

Pakistan 

Mohammadabad, Sindh,

See also
Muhammadabad, Mau India
Mohammad Aliabad (disambiguation)